Gaetano Scala (born 6 December 1932) is an Italian modern pentathlete. He competed at the 1960 Summer Olympics.

References

1932 births
Living people
Italian male modern pentathletes
Olympic modern pentathletes of Italy
Modern pentathletes at the 1960 Summer Olympics
Sportspeople from Naples